Vojislav Vujević (born 2 March 1955) is a Croatian judoka. He competed at the 1980 and the 1984 Summer Olympics, representing Yugoslavia.

References

External links
 
 
 

1955 births
Living people
Croatian male judoka
Olympic judoka of Yugoslavia
Judoka at the 1980 Summer Olympics
Judoka at the 1984 Summer Olympics
Sportspeople from Osijek